Jazz at the Plaza Vol. I is a live album by The Miles Davis Sextet. It was recorded in 1958 and released in 1973 by Columbia Records. Duke Ellington was recorded at the same event and released as the second volume (Jazz at the Plaza Vol. II).

Background 
The album features the famed sextet that recorded Kind of Blue six months later. The concert was recorded in 1958 but not released in full until 1973. The last three songs would reappear (in reverse order) in 1974, on 1958 Miles, but on Jazz at the Plaza all the tracks are of much better sound quality. The musicians did not know they were being recorded at the time. The event was a party thrown by Columbia to celebrate the healthy state of their jazz division. Indeed, it was not meant to be a record session: "it was a party. We taped it because we wanted to remember it, in case it never happened again." Pianist Bill Evans later stated the musicians who were still alive at the time of release were offered payment at the 1958 scale.

"My Funny Valentine", which had become a staple in the sextet's play book, is played by Davis in his new modal style. On "Straight, No Chaser", he plays the theme faster than usual and alternates the groove between full and cut time, while Bill Evans quotes "Blue Monk" in his own solo.

The original LP misidentified the tune "Straight, No Chaser" as "Jazz at the Plaza", the drummer as Philly Joe Jones, and the location as the Edwardian Room.

Critical reception 

Allmusic's Thom Jurek gave the album four out of five stars and felt that, despite Sony's remastering, it "succeeds mightily on the level" of a "remarkable" band's "fine performance". He recommended it strictly to jazz listeners as a "curiosity piece" because of its "dodgy" and "dubious sound quality." In its four-star review of the album, Down Beat magazine found the music "engaging" and stated, "The intrigue from the redefined hard-bop here has everything to do with Davis' elliptical phrasings and seeming impatience with the latter-day offspring of bebop".

Track listing

Personnel 
Miles Davis – trumpet
John Coltrane – tenor saxophone
Julian "Cannonball" Adderley – alto saxophone
Bill Evans – piano
Paul Chambers – bass
Jimmy Cobb – drums

References

External links 
 

Miles Davis live albums
1973 live albums
Columbia Records live albums
Albums produced by Teo Macero